Irakli Shengelia (born 13 April 1981) is a Georgian-Israeli professional association football player who plies his trade at FC Merani Tbilisi.

Shengelia previously played for Spartak Moscow 2 and FC Nyva Ternopil.

References

1981 births
Living people
Association football forwards
Footballers from Georgia (country)
Expatriate footballers from Georgia (country)
Georgian emigrants to Israel
Israeli footballers
FC Spartak Moscow players
FC Nyva Ternopil players
FC Dinamo Batumi players
Hapoel Kfar Saba F.C. players
Hapoel Nir Ramat HaSharon F.C. players
Ukrainian Premier League players
Israeli Premier League players
Liga Leumit players
Expatriate footballers in Ukraine
Expatriate sportspeople from Georgia (country) in Ukraine
Israeli people of Georgian descent
Naturalized citizens of Israel